Flavocytochrome c sulfide dehydrogenase, also known as Sulfide-cytochrome-c reductase (flavocytochrome c), is an enzyme with systematic name hydrogen-sulfide:flavocytochrome c oxidoreductase. It is found in sulfur-oxidising bacteria such as the purple phototrophic bacteria Allochromatium vinosum. This enzyme catalyses the following chemical reaction:

 hydrogen sulfide + 2 ferricytochrome c  sulfur + 2 ferrocytochrome c + 2 H+

These enzymes are heterodimers of a flavoprotein (fccB ) and a dihaem cytochrome (fccA) that carry out hydrogen sulfide-dependent cytochrome C reduction. The dihaem cytochrome folds into two domains, each of which resembles mitochondrial cytochrome c, with the two haem groups bound to the interior of the subunit. The flavoprotein subunit has a glutathione reductase-like fold consisting of a beta(3,4)-alpha(3) core, and an alpha+beta sandwich. The active site of the flavoprotein subunit contains a catalytically important disulfide bridge located above the pyrimidine portion of the flavin ring. The flavoprotein contains a C-terminal domain required for binding to flavin, and subsequent electron transfer. Electrons are transferred from the flavin to one of the haem groups in the cytochrome. Both FAD and heme C are covalently bound to the protein.

References

External links 
 

EC 1.8.2
Protein domains